Celebrity Wedding Planner is a British reality television series that premiered on Channel 5 on 6 January 2012. The series revolves around brides-to-be handing over the planning of their wedding to a surprise celebrity or celebrity pairing.

The series proved successful and was commissioned for third and fourth series in November 2012.

Format
One or two celebrities are given the task of organising a couple's wedding day. All they are given is a 60-second message from the couple, a tour of the couple's house and two sidekicks from either partner to help them with the process. They have a set budget to spend on everything (including the stag and hen nights) and only have three weeks to arrange the wedding. They are allowed no contact with the couple until a few days before the wedding and nothing is allowed to be revealed to the couple beforehand.

Episodes

Series 1 (2012)

Series 2 (2012)

Series 3 (2013)

Series 4 (2013/14)

References

British reality television series